Theta Antliae (θ Ant, θ Antliae) is the Bayer designation for a binary star in the southern constellation of Antlia. The pair have a combined apparent visual magnitude of +4.78; the brighter component is magnitude +5.30 while the secondary is +6.18.

The primary component of this system, θ Antliae A, has a stellar classification of A8 Vm, indicating that it is an A-type main sequence star with enhanced metallic lines in its spectrum. The companion, θ Antliae B, is a giant star with a classification of G7 III. The pair have an orbital period of 18.3 years, a significant eccentricity of 0.445, and they have an angular separation of 0.1 arcseconds.

References

084367
Antliae, Theta
Antlia
Binary stars
A-type main-sequence stars
G-type giants
047758
3871
Durchmusterung objects
Am stars